HMS Rose and similar, is the name of several ships. These include:

Royal Navy ships designated "HMS"
Twenty ships of the British Royal Navy have been named Rose or HMS Rose after the rose:

  was a King's ship in 1222.
  was a Cinque Ports ship in 1300.  She was captured by the French in 1338 but was retaken in 1340.
  was a ballinger acquired in 1419 and sold in 1425.
  was a galley listed from 1512 until 1521.
  was a 6-gun pink launched in 1657 and transferred in 1661 to the Irish Packet Service.
  was a 4-gun fireship captured from the Algerians in 1670 and expended in 1671.
  was a 6-gun dogger captured from the Dutch in 1672 and lost in 1673.
  was a 28-gun fifth rate launched in 1674, converted into a fireship in 1689 and sold in 1698.
  (also known as Sally Rose) was a 16-gun sixth rate, formerly a Salé pirate captured in 1684 and sold in 1696.
  was a 20-gun sixth rate purchased in 1709 and sold in 1712.
  was a 20-gun sixth rate launched in 1712, rebuilt in 1724, hulked in 1739 and sold in 1744.
  was a 24-gun sixth rate launched in 1740 and sold in 1755.
  was a 20-gun sixth rate launched in 1757 and sunk as a block ship in 1779.
  was a 28-gun sixth rate launched in 1783 and wrecked in 1794.
  was an 18-gun sloop launched in 1805 and sold in 1817 for breaking up.

  was an 18-gun sloop launched in 1821 and broken up in 1851.
  was an  launched in 1856 and broken up in 1868.
  was a survey cutter purchased in 1857. She was stranded in 1864 and the wreck later sold.
  was a coastguard yawl launched in 1880 and sold in 1906.
  was a  launched in 1941.

Other vessels
  – any one of five hired armed vessels that served the Royal Navy between 1799 and 1804
 , a 1970 replica of the 1757 HMS Rose, now named HMS Surprise, originally launched as HMS Rose

See also
 Rose (disambiguation)

Notes

Royal Navy ship names